Anna Davidovna Abamelik-Lazareva (Lazarian) (Baratinskaya, April 15, 1814 in  Saint-Petersburg - November 25, 1889 in Saint-Petersburg) was a Russian-Armenian translator, lady-in-waiting, socialite and public figure. She was recognized as one of the most beautiful women of Russia of her times.

She was the daughter of David Semyonovich Abamelik. She was a friend and translator of Alexander Pushkin.

Abamelik-Lazareva married to the governor of Kazan, Irakli Baratinsky, the brother of Russian poet Yevgeny Baratynsky. She knew English, French, Armenian and German, translated poems by Pushkin, Mikhail Lermontov, etc. and published them in Europe, also translated some prominent European poets into Russian.

References

Sources
Armenian Concise Encyclopedia, Ed. by acad. K. Khudaverdian, Yerevan, 1990, Vol. 1, p. 8

External links
Biography

Armenian people from the Russian Empire
Heads of schools in Russia
People from Saint Petersburg
1814 births
1889 deaths
Anna Davidovna
Lazarev family
20th-century Russian educators